was a town located in Shisō District, Hyōgo Prefecture, Japan.

As of 2003, the town had an estimated population of 3,876 and a density of 37.07 persons per km². The total area was 104.57 km².

On April 1, 2005, Chikusa, along with the towns of Haga, Ichinomiya and Yamasaki (all from Shisō District), was merged to create the city of Shisō and no longer exists as an independent municipality.

The town offered a reward for any sightings of a legendary being called a Tsuchinoko (:ja:ツチノコ) and still has a mascot called Tsuchi-kun based on the legend.

External links
 Official website of Shisō in Japanese
 Article about various Tsuchinoko in the region.

Dissolved municipalities of Hyōgo Prefecture
Shisō, Hyōgo
Populated places disestablished in 2005
2005 disestablishments in Japan